"Goodies and Politics" is the first episode of the eighth series of the British television comedy  series The Goodies. The 64th episode of the show overall, it was first broadcast at 8.10pm on BBC2.

This episode is also known as "Politics" and "Timita".

Written by The Goodies, with songs and music by Bill Oddie.

Plot
The British prime minister has discovered a loophole in tax laws and retired to the Bahamas. Her government and the opposition members of parliament give themselves a massive pay rise and join her, leaving Britain without a government. The Queen telephones the Goodies and requests their assistance in finding a new leader for the country. In a parody of Evita, Tim and Bill stand for election - Tim as "Timita" and Bill as "Che". The election is tied at one vote each, as the televised campaign period was so exciting that no one bothered to vote, apart from the two candidates. Timita and Che form a coalition government, which ends up involved in absurd game show antics devised by Graeme. The episode ends with the news that Margaret Thatcher will return to Britain.

Cultural references
 Margaret Thatcher
 Evita
 Eva Perón
 Che Guevara
 It's a Knockout
 Song: "Don't Cry for Me Argentina" - Tim sings to his two female helpers: "Don't cry for me, Marge and Tina."
 Stuart Hall

References

 "The Complete Goodies" — Robert Ross, B T Batsford, London, 2000
 "The Goodies Rule OK" — Robert Ross, Carlton Books Ltd, Sydney, 2006
 "From Fringe to Flying Circus — 'Celebrating a Unique Generation of Comedy 1960-1980'" — Roger Wilmut, Eyre Methuen Ltd, 1980
 "The Goodies Episode Summaries" — Brett Allender
 "The Goodies — Fact File" — Matthew K. Sharp
 "TV Heaven" — Jim Sangster & Paul Condon, HarperCollinsPublishers, London, 2005

External links
 
 ("Goodies and Politics" is listed under an alternative title at IMDb)

The Goodies (series 8) episodes
1980 British television episodes